Brian Lawson is an American businessman and politician who is currently serving as a member of the South Carolina House of Representatives from the 30th district. Lawson is a Republican.

Early life and career

Lawson was born in Spartanburg, South Carolina and graduated from Dorman High School. He worked as a career firefighter, achieving the rank of captain. He also worked as a reserve police officer and paramedic. Lawson later established his own private ambulance company and graduated from Columbia Southern University in 2022 with an Associate Degree.

Political career

Lawson ran unopposed in the 2022 general election. He succeeded Steve Moss (politician), who had held the office since 2009 and did not seek reelection. He assumed office on December 6, 2022.

In 2023, Lawson was briefly among the Republican co-sponsors of the South Carolina Prenatal Equal Protection Act of 2023, which would make women who had abortions eligible for the death penalty; he later withdrew his sponsorship.

References

Living people
1973 births
American businesspeople
Republican Party members of the South Carolina House of Representatives
Columbia Southern University alumni